Lester Frank Bishop (April 12, 1889 – March 28, 1967) was a pioneer aviator who delivered air mail.

He was born in Chicago, Illinois. He made his first flight in a Rumpler Taube on August 4, 1916. In 1922 he filed for divorce. He died in San Diego, California.

References

External links
Lester Frank Bishop

Aviation pioneers
1889 births
1967 deaths
Members of the Early Birds of Aviation
United States airmail pilots